Dušan Andrić (born 8 May 1946) is a former Serbian footballer who was best known as a midfielder of Red Star Belgrade in the 1960s.

Club career
He played for Red Star between 1963 until 1966. He also played with FK Sutjeska Nikšić, FK Vojvodina and FK Spartak Subotica before moving abroad to play in Germany with Wuppertaler SV Borussia in the 2. Bundesliga in the 1975–76 season.

References

External links
 

1948 births
Living people
Footballers from Nikšić
Association football midfielders
Yugoslav footballers
Red Star Belgrade footballers
FK Sutjeska Nikšić players
FK Vojvodina players
FK Spartak Subotica players
Wuppertaler SV players
Yugoslav First League players
2. Bundesliga players
Yugoslav expatriate footballers
Expatriate footballers in Germany
Yugoslav expatriate sportspeople in Germany